Krzysztof Buchowski (born 1969) is a Polish historian at Institute of History at University of Białystok. He specializes in Central and Eastern European history in 19th-20th century and Polish-Lithuanian relations.

Books 
Polacy w niepodległym państwie litewskim 1918-1940 (Białystok, Instytut Historii Uniwersytetu w Białymstoku, 1999) ;
Panowie i żmogusy. Stosunki polsko-litewskie w międzywojennych karykaturach (Białystok, Instytut Historii Uniwersytetu w Białymstoku, 2004) ;
Szkice polsko-litewskie czyli o niełatwym sąsiedztwie w pierwszej polowie XX wieku (Wydawnictwo Grado, 2005) ;
Litwomani i polonizatorzy. Mity, wzajemne postrzeganie i stereotypy w stosunkach polsko-litewskich w pierwszej połowie XX wieku (Białystok, Wydawnictwo Uniwersytetu w Białymstoku, 2006) ;
Polityka zagraniczna Litwy 1990-2012. Główne kierunki i uwarunkowania (Białystok 2013, Wydawnictwo Uniwersyteckie Trans Humana, 2013) .

References
Homepage at University of Białymstok
Short biography

1969 births
Living people
21st-century Polish historians
Polish male non-fiction writers
Academic staff of the University of Białystok